Ernesto Javier Cordero Arroyo (born 9 May 1968) is a Mexican actuary, public servant and politician affiliated with the .

He has been Secretary of State on two occasions: he was Secretary of Social Development, and Finance Secretary, when he resigned to take part in the internal elections for the Presidency of Mexico for the PAN. Cordero was the President of the Mexican Senate, a role traditionally rotated amongst the three biggest parties in Congress for one-year terms, from September 2012 to August 2013, and again from September 2017 to August 2018.

Personal life

Family 
Ernesto Cordero was born in Mexico City on 9 May 1968. Son of Ernesto Cordero Galindo, a well-known professor of medicine at the National Autonomous University of Mexico (UNAM), and of Graciela Arroyo, a nurse who directed for two periods the “Escuela Nacional de Enfermeria y Obstetricia (National School of Infirmary and Obstetrics) of the UNAM. On May 16, 2006, Marta Sahagún inaugurated the Esplanade of the Distinguished Nurses and unveiled a bust in her honor at the headquarters of the Ministry of Health. He has a sister: Graciela Cordero Arroyo who is a pedagogue in the UNAM and has a doctorate in education from the University of Barcelona.

Education 
He majored as an actuary in the Instituto Tecnológico Autónomo de México (ITAM).  He also got a master’s degree in economics by the University of Pennsylvania where he also did some doctorate studies.

Working Experience and Politics
When he finished his postgraduate studies in 2011, Cordero was in charge of the General Management of the Miguel Estrada Iturbide Foundation of the PAN, this institution is in charge of giving technical counseling in legislative projects to the members of the Parliamentary Group of the PAN in the House of Representatives.

 In 2003 he was Director of Integral Administration of Risks in the “Banco Nacional de Obras y Servicios Públicos (BANOBRAS)”.
 In 2004 he was appointed undersecretary of Energetic and Technological Development Planning in the Energy Secretariat.
 In 2006 he was appointed undersecretary of Expenditures in the Finance Secretariat.
 In 2008 he was appointed secretary in the Social Development Secretariat.
 In 2009 he was appointed secretary in the Finance Secretariat.

Ernesto Cordero has been a professor of international economics at the University of Pennsylvania; of economics and statistics at the Instituto Tecnológico Autónomo de México and of econometrics in the Center of Research and Economics Teaching at the Universidad Panamericana.

In 2004, along with a reduced group of public servants, he resigned to the charge of undersecretary of Energy and Technological Development in the Energy Secretariat (SENER), to join the secretary of the SENER at that time, Felipe Calderón Hinojosa, in his pre-candidature for the Mexican Presidency. In this campaign, Cordero was the coordinator of Public Politics.

Social Development Secretary 

On June 15, 2008, Mexican president Felipe Calderón Hinojosa named him the Head of the Social Development Secretariat in substitution of Beatriz Zavala Peniche.

As Secretary, he designed and implemented different politics in social development; strengthening, modernizing and making transparent programs with a high impact on the lifestyle conditions of the Mexicans.

He also faced the international financial crisis of 2008 and 2009. To counteract the increase of international prices in food, he incorporated new supports in the social programs and he made sure to keep the stability of the prices in the poorest regions of the country:

 During the crisis almost 150 families were incorporated to the Program of Food Support, and nearly 230 thousand new families to the Program Opportunities.
 In addition to the expansion of the programs, there was an increase of US$10 per family of Opportunities monthly, to face the rise in prices and another of US$9 per child up to 9 years old, monthly.
 Through the programs like Liconsa and Diconsa, the stability in food prices was maintained, the milk remained at US$0.33 per liter, the kilo of corn remained at US$0.29 and the one of corn flour Mi Masa remained at US$0.41. Besides, the trade of other products of the home brand Sedesol-Diconsa started at a very low price and of a very good quality such as soups, coffee, salt, chocolate and soaps.

Ernesto Cordero played an important role when facing the AH1N1 flu outbreak due to his support in the coordination of strategies to give attention to the public together with the Health Secretariat.

From 2007 to 2009 1 million 300 thousand floors were placed to benefit almost 4.8 million people.

During 2009 the coverage of the Program 70 and more was extended, it gives support to the elder people of the third age in places with up to 30 thousand inhabitants, increasing the number of beneficiaries in almost 200 thousand.

Finance Secretary 

On 9 December 2009, Felipe Calderón Hinojosa the President of Mexico appointed him Finance Secretary in substitution of Agustín Carstens. He was the first Finance Secretary from the PAN.

Cordero led the economic recovery, the consolidation of the public finance and the implementation of new politics with a social view.

 As Finance Secretary, Cordero has been the main character in the economic recovery, the economic and treasury politics he implemented allowed a growth in 2010 of 5.5%, a bigger figure than the estimated 4.4% when the year started.  This growth allowed employment to increase; between December 2009 and March 2011 almost a million of new employments were created.
 The treasury simplification and modernization allowed the enlargement of the treasury base.
 During 2010 the incomes due to taxes not related to the oil reached their historical maximum of 10% of the GDP.
 The amount of tax payers reached a historical number of 38.9 million people with an increase of 4.8 million tax payers in just 1 year, the highest increase of tax payers since 2005.
 With Ernesto Cordero as the Head of the Finance Secretariat, the electronic invoice was implemented and in 2011 a new record of online tax returns made by companies was achieved, with an increase of almost 10% in comparison to the previous year.  The increase in the use of Internet to do the annual tax returns is remarkable, 99% of the returns were done though the Internet, an increase of almost 4% compared to the previous year.
 Talking about expenditure, in 2010 there was an expenditure in social development as never before, almost 60% of the programmed expenditure was to support families in poverty and in the investment of basic infrastructure to benefit the low income population.
 98% of the houses in Mexico have electric energy (versus 95% in 2000) and 91.5% have water (versus 88% in 2000).
 Houses with dirt instead of floor decreased, going from 13.2% to 6.2% between 2000 and 2010.
 Today more than 25.4 million houses have drainage (90.3%), this is to say 8.6 million more than in 2000.

On 9 September 2011, he resigned from his position at the Finance Secretariat to compete for the presidential candidature of the PAN.

National and International Committees 

He has been President of the Committee of the Assembly of Governors of the "Banco Interamericano de Desarrollo" (BID); Co-president of the Committee of Transition of the United Nations for the Design of the Green Climate Fund; Co-president of the Group of Work of the G-20 for the Revision of the international monetary systems.

In Mexico he has been President of the National Counsel of Social Politics; President of Financial System Stability Council; Coordinator of the Social Cabinet, as well as a Member of the Security Cabinet.

Presidential Pre-campaign for the 2012 elections 

In 2011, he fought to become the elected candidate of the PAN to run for the Mexican Presidency against Santiago Creel Miranda and Josefina Vázquez Mota; Josefina Vázquez Mota won on 5 February 2012.

Candidate for Senator 

In February 2012, the National Commission of Elections of the PAN disclosed Ernesto Cordero as the first candidate in the party's national list for the Senate of the Republic. This action, given PAN's status as a major national party, guaranteed that Cordero would be elected Senator in the July 2012 elections.

References

1968 births
Living people
National Action Party (Mexico) politicians
Mexican Secretaries of Finance
Presidents of the Senate of the Republic (Mexico)
Politicians from Mexico City
21st-century Mexican politicians
Members of the Constituent Assembly of Mexico City
Instituto Tecnológico Autónomo de México alumni